Bregenz railway station is a railway station in the municipality of Bregenz, located in the Bregenz district in Vorarlberg, Austria. It is an intermediate stop of the Vorarlberg line of Austrian Federal Railways.

Services 
 the following services stop at Bregenz:

 Railjet:
 six trains per day to Wien Hauptbahnhof or Vienna Airport.
 Nightjet: daily overnight train to Wien Hauptbahnhof.
 EuroCity: six trains per day between Zürich Hauptbahnhof and München Hauptbahnhof.
 Vorarlberg S-Bahn: 

Notable places nearby
Lake Constance

References

External links 
 
 

Railway stations in Vorarlberg
Buildings and structures in Vorarlberg
Vorarlberg S-Bahn stations